Tephrosia purpurea is a species of flowering plant in the family Fabaceae, that has a pantropical distribution. It is a common wasteland weed. In many parts it is under cultivation as green manure crop. It is found throughout India and Sri Lanka in poor soils.

Common names include: 
Bengali: জংলী নীল (Jangli neel), বন নীল।
English: Fish poison, wild indigo
Hawaiian: Auhuhu, Ahuhu, Auhola, Hola
Hindi name: Sarphonk, Sharpunkha
Rajasthani: Masa
Tamil: Kolinchi (கொழிஞ்சி), Kollukkai Velai (கொள்ளுக்காய்_வேளை),kaaivelai(காய்வேளை )
Telugu: Vempali (వెంపలి), Pampara chettu
Malayalam: Kozhinjil (കൊഴിഞ്ഞിൽ) 
Kannada: Kaggi
Duk: Jangli-kulthi

Uses 
In SIDDHA ;
SEED uses  Anthelmintic ;
ROOT uses  Nutritive

Fish poison 
Tephrosia purpurea is used as a fish poison for fishing. Its leaves and seeds contain tephrosin, which paralyzes fish. Larger doses are lethal to fish, but mammals and amphibians are unaffected.

Ethnomedicine 
Tephrosia purpurea is also used traditionally as folk medicine. According to Ayurveda, the plant is anthelmintic, alexiteric, restorative, and antipyretic. It is used in the treatment of leprosy, ulcers, asthma, and tumors, as well as diseases of the liver, spleen, heart, and blood. A decoction of the roots is given in dyspepsia, diarrhea, rheumatism, asthma and urinary disorders. The root powder is salutary for brushing the teeth, where it is said to quickly relieve dental pains and stop bleeding. An extract, termed 'betaphroline' (not a systematic name) is claimed to promote release of endorphins, and finds use in certain cosmetic preparations. African shepherds use crushed plants to make an antidotal beverage for animals bitten by snakes.

Feed and manure 
Tephrosia purpurea has been reported to provide fodder to animals such as goats. It makes also a good green manure in fields.

References

 
 Bishop Museum Hawaiian Ethnobotany Online Database. Downloaded on 24 September 2007.

External links

purpurea
Flora of Hawaii